The 1992–93 USISL indoor was an American soccer season run by the United States Interregional Soccer League during the winter of 1992 to 1993.

Regular season

Southeast Conference

South Central Conference

Southwest Conference

Playoffs

First round
In February 1993, the USISL continued its tradition of peculiar playoffs.  The first round had two Southwest Conference teams, the Arizona Cotton and Tucson Amigos playing two games.  Arizona won both 6-3 and 10-9.  Then, all four Southeast Conference teams, the Atlanta Magic, Chattanooga Railroaders, Knoxville Impact, played a round robin series to determine which team advanced in the playoffs.  Both South Central Conference teams, the Oklahoma City Warriors and Dallas Kickers received first round byes.

Southeast Conference playoff group

Game 1:  Atlanta 6, Nashville 0
Game 2:  Atlanta 7, Knoxville 2
Game 3:  Chattanooga 3, Knoxville 2
Game 4:  Chattanooga 6, Nashville 2
Game 5:  Atlanta 7, Chattanooga 4
Game 6:  Nashville vs. Knoxville - Not played

Sizzling Four
Although the Oklahoma City Warriors finished with the same record and a better goal differential than the Arizona Cotton, the Cotton had defeated the Warriors, giving them the second spot in the Sizzlin' Four round.

Final

Points leaders

Honors
 Most Valuable Player: Richie Richmond
 Top Goal Scorer: Marcello Draguicevich
 Top Goalkeeper: Yaro Dachniwsky 
 Coach of the Year: Zelimar Antonievic,
 Rookie of the Year: Omar Felix

External links
The Year in American Soccer - 1993

USISL indoor seasons
United
United